NOAAS Mount Mitchell (S 222) was an American survey vessel in commission in the National Oceanic and Atmospheric Administration from 1970 to 1995. Prior to her NOAA career, she was in commission in the United States Coast and Geodetic Survey as USC&GS Mount Mitchell (MSS 22) from 1968 to 1970. In 2003, she returned to service as the private research ship R/V Mt. Mitchell.

Construction and commissioning
Mount Mitchell was built for the U.S. Coast and Geodetic Survey as a "medium survey ship" (MSS) at the Aerojet-General Shipyards in Jacksonville, Florida. Launched on 29 November 1966, she was commissioned into the Coast and Geodetic Survey in March 1968 as USC&GS Mount Mitchell (MSS 22). When the Survey merged with other organizations to form NOAA in 1970, she became part of the NOAA fleet as NOAAS Mount Mitchell (S 222).

USC&GS and NOAAS Mount Mitchell, 1968–1995
Mount Mitchell operated as a multipurpose vessel. She had an oceanographic laboratory, several echosounders, and an oceanographic winch. She also had a hydroplot data-processing system, as did two of her survey launches.

Mount Mitchell conducted hydrographic surveys on the United States East Coast and in the Caribbean, and served as an oceanographic vessel throughout much of the North Atlantic Ocean on various projects. In the late 1980s she was fitted with a multi-beam sounding system for hydrographic work related to establishing the maritime exclusive economic zone of the United States and discovered Mitchell Dome among other large, economically significant undersea features in the Gulf of Mexico. In 1992 she proceeded to the Persian Gulf to study the effects of the 1990–1991 Persian Gulf War oil spills into the Gulf. After returning to the United States, she resumed operations as a hydrographic survey vessel until decommissioning in 1995.

Awards
 Department of Commerce Silver Medal

In a ceremony on 9 November 1992 in Washington, D.C., Mount Mitchell was awarded the Department of Commerce Silver Medal for her 1990–1991 Persian Gulf cruise. The program for the ceremony cited her achievements as follows:

NOAA Ship Mt. Mitchell, Atlantic Marine Center, completed a historic cruise surveying environmental damage in the Persian Gulf caused by oil spills. The cruise is the first major oceanographic survey of the Persian Gulf since 1977 and is the most comprehensive ever in terms of geographic and subject area coverage. Conquering numerous obstacles in a dangerous environment, the crew of the Mt. Mitchell acquired data against which future changes in water quality can be assessed.

R/V Mt. Mitchell, 2001–Present

After six years of inactivity, the decommissioned Mount Mitchell was purchased in 2001 by Mt. Mitchell LLC and was completely refurbished and retrofitted with the latest in electronics, machinery, and safety equipment. With her refit complete, she arrived in Seattle, Washington, in 2003 to begin her career as the private research ship R/V Mt. Mitchell. She is managed and operated by Global Seas LLC, headquartered in Seattle.

In 2008, Mt. Mitchell was outfitted with the most advanced underwater mapping equipment available. Her Kongsberg EM 120 and EM 710 high-resolution multibeam mapping systems offer a state-of-the-art capability to perform seabed mapping to full ocean depth with unrivaled resolution, coverage, and accuracy.  The EM 120 system allows for accurate surveys to a depth of 11,000 meters (36,089 feet), while the EM 710 allows for accurate mapping to a depth of 2,000 meters (6,562 feet).  The vessel is an acoustically quiet platform capable of supporting sophisticated sonar operations in deep water and high sea states.  To ensure ship-related noise does not degrade the vessel′s capability to perform her science mission at full performance, the sonar systems are installed in a gondola arrangement below her hull. In addition, custom-designed propellers were installed in early 2011 to improve her efficiency.

In 2008, Mt. Mitchell was outfitted with stabilization tanks and anti-roll chocks which have eliminated much of her natural roll, making her an ideal platform for surveying. Mt. Mitchell is a very quiet vessel in comparison to other commercial research platforms and performance and acoustical testing of the EM 710 sonar demonstrated that it is identical to that obtained on the quietest United States Navy research vessels.

Mt. Mitchell also operates two launches, R/V Mt. Augustine and R/V Mt. Shishaldin. For shallow-water surveying, Mt. Augustine is a 32-foot (9.75-meter) Silver Streak cuddy-cabin twin-diesel craft outfitted with a multibeam sidescan sonar mount and laboratory space that Mt. Mitchell launches and retrieves through a Vestdavit system. Mt. Shishaldin is a 25-foot (7.6-meter) landing craft that can seat six people and has a drop-down bow for landing on remote beaches; it can be used for ferrying people between ship and shore, tide gauging, and hauling all-terrain vehicles.

Notes

References
Prézelin, Bernard, and A. D. Baker III, eds. The Naval Institute Guide to Combat Fleets of the World 1990/1991: Their Ships, Aircraft, and Armament. Annapolis, Maryland: United States Naval Institute, 1990. .
NOAA History, A Science Odyssey: Tools of the Trade: Coast and Geodetic Survey Ships: Mt. Mitchell

External links 

 

Ships of the National Oceanic and Atmospheric Administration
Survey ships of the United States
Ships built in Jacksonville, Florida
1966 ships
North Carolina-related ships
Recipients of the Department of Commerce Silver Medal